Yul Hansel Bürkle Solorzano (born September 30, 1974) is a Venezuelan actor and model of German ancestry.

Personal life
He is engaged to actress Scarlet Ortiz, a fellow Venezuelan actress whom he met on the set of the RCTV telenovela Mis 3 hermanas. On March 9, 2010, Yul became a father to a baby girl named Bárbara Briana, after Scarlet gave birth at Mount Sinai Hospital in Miami. Her godparents are actress Gaby Espino and soap opera writer Alberto Gomez.

Filmography

References

External links
 

Venezuelan male models
Venezuelan male telenovela actors
Male actors from Caracas
Venezuelan people of German descent
1974 births
Living people